The Leader of the Opposition in the Himachal Pradesh Legislative Assembly is the politician who leads the official opposition in  the Himachal Pradesh Legislative Assembly.

Eligibility 
Official Opposition is a term used in Himachal Pradesh Legislative Assembly to designate the political party which has secured the second largest number of seats in the assembly. In order to get formal recognition, the party must have at least 10% of total membership of the Legislative Assembly.

Role 
In legislature, opposition party has a major role and must act to discourage the party in power from acting against the interests of the country and the common man. They are expected to alert the population and the Government on the content of any bill, which is not in the best interests of the country.

List of Leaders of the Opposition

See also 

 Government of Himachal Pradesh
 Governor of Himachal Pradesh
 Chief Minister of Himachal Pradesh
 Himachal Pradesh Legislative Assembly
 Himachal Pradesh Council of Ministers
 List of current Indian opposition leaders

References 

Uttar Pradesh Legislative Assembly